Hellenia is a genus of plants in the  Costaceae described as a genus with this name in 1791. It is native to Southeast Asia, southern China, the Indian Subcontinent, New Guinea, and Queensland.  The type species was "H. grandiflora" Retz., which is a synonym of Hellenia speciosa.

Species
Plants of the World Online currently includes the following (with some botanists preferring to retain the genus Cheilocostus):
 Hellenia borneensis (A.D.Poulsen) Govaerts
 Hellenia globosa (Blume) S.R.Dutta - Thailand, Peninsular Malaysia, Borneo, Sumatra, Java
 Hellenia lacera (Gagnep.) Govaerts
 Hellenia sopuensis (Maas & H.Maas) Govaerts
 Hellenia speciosa (J.Koenig) S.R.Dutta (synonym Cheilocostus speciosus) - China, Indian Subcontinent, Andaman & Nicobar, Indochina, Malaysia, Indonesia, Philippines, New Guinea, Bismarck Archipelago, Queensland; naturalized in Mauritius, Réunion, Hawaii, Central America, West Indies

 formerly included
now in other genera: Alpinia Hornstedtia Plagiostachys

References

Costaceae
Zingiberales genera
Taxa named by Anders Jahan Retzius